Moara Domnească may refer to:

 Moara Domnească, Găneasa, Ilfov, Romania
 Moara Domnească, Râfov, Prahova, Romania
 Moara Domnească, Văleni, Vaslui, Romania
 Moara Domnească, Viișoara, Glodeni, Moldova